Count Claus-Casimir of Orange-Nassau, Jonkheer van Amsberg (Claus-Casimir Bernhard Marius Max; born 21 March 2004), is the second child of Prince Constantijn and Princess Laurentien of the Netherlands and their only son. He is a member of the Dutch Royal Family and is sixth in the line of succession to the Dutch throne.

Life 
His birth was overshadowed by the death, only a day before, of his great-grandmother Queen Juliana. He has two sisters: Countess Eloise, born 8 June 2002 and Countess Leonore, born 3 June 2006.

His baptism took place in the chapel of Het Loo Palace in Apeldoorn on 10 October 2004. Claus-Casimir's godparents are King Willem-Alexander, Prince Maurits of Orange-Nassau, van Vollenhoven, Ed P. Spanjaard, and Countess Tatiana Razumovsky von Wigstein.

After studying at Vrijzinnig Christelijk Lyceum (VCL) in The Hague, at the age of 16, Claus-Casimir moved to Scotland to attend Gordonstoun School.

Titles and styles
By royal decree of 11 May 2001, nr. 227, it was determined that all children and male-line descendants of Prince Constantijn of the Netherlands would be counts and countesses of Orange-Nassau with the honorific jonkheer or jonkvrouwe van Amsberg, and have the surname Van Oranje-Nassau van Amsberg. As he is her only grandson, Claus-Casimir is currently the only one of Queen Beatrix's grandchildren who will be able to pass this title on to his children.

Upon the abdication of Queen Beatrix on 30 April 2013, the children of Prince Constantijn and Princess Laurentien ceased to be members of the Royal House, although they continue to be members of the royal family.

References

2004 births
Living people
People educated at Gordonstoun
House of Orange-Nassau
Counts of Orange-Nassau
Jonkheers of Amsberg